Cordia sebestena is a shrubby tree in the borage family, Boraginaceae, native to the American tropics.  It ranges from southern Florida in the United States and the Bahamas, southwards throughout Central America and the Greater Antilles. Common names have included siricote or kopté (Mayan) in 19th Century northern Yucatán, scarlet cordia in Jamaica, and Geiger tree (after Key West wrecker John Geiger) in Florida.

Description

The crown is round to vase-shaped. Branches tend to be somewhat drooping, and the tree is naturally multitrunked.

These leaves are covered with small hairs, lending them a rough, "sandpapery" texture.

Flowers are produced in clusters at branch ends throughout the year, particularly in the spring and summer. The species is heterostylous and presumably self-incompatible. Pear-shaped fruits follow the flowers, averaging  in length. Fruits are fragrant and edible, but not flavorful.

Cultivation
Cordia sebestena is widely planted throughout the tropics as an ornamental plant in gardens for its showy flowers. It is a slow-growing plant, and sheds enough leaves and fruit to require some upkeep. The wood is rather light in density, but branches are not prone to breakage. The tree should be pruned in its youth to establish a structure, as it is prone to low branching. Soil tolerance is fairly broad, provided the soil drains well. Cordia sebestena tolerates drought, but not frost. It is not particularly susceptible to pests and diseases, other than the geiger tortoise beetle, which can cause occasional defoliation. This plant tolerates salt spray found near the ocean. It enjoys full sun, and can grow in a part-day sun situation as well. Its uses include: street tree, shade tree, even as a container subject in its youth. It is planted in traffic medians and parking lots, and is a useful seaside subject.

Gallery

References

USDA plant Classification Cordia sebestena

External links

sebestena
Plants described in 1753
Taxa named by Carl Linnaeus
Trees of the Caribbean
Trees of Central America
Flora of Florida
Trees of Quintana Roo
Trees of the Yucatán Peninsula
Garden plants of North America
Ornamental trees
Drought-tolerant trees